Eibenschütz is a European Jewish surname whose origin is traced to the Moravian town of Ivančice - Eybenschütz in German. 

Notable people with the surname include:

 Albert Eibenschütz, German pianist, cousin of Ilona Eibenschütz
 Camilla Eibenschütz, German actress, daughter of Albert Eibenschütz
 David Solomon Eibenschütz, Russian rabbi and author; died in Safed, Palestine, 1812
 Ilona Eibenschütz, Hungarian pianist; born at Budapest
 Jonathan Eybeschütz (Jonathan Eibenschütz), Central European rabbi and Talmudist in 18th Century; born in Cracow 
 Simon Aaron Eibenschütz, Danish philanthropist; born in Copenhagen

See also
 Ivančice, a town in the Czech Republic whose name in German is "Eibenschütz"

German-language surnames